Chase Coleman (born March 20, 1985) is an American actor, director, and musician. Coleman portrayed the character of Billy Winslow in the HBO TV series Boardwalk Empire and the werewolf, Oliver, on the CW spin-off series, The Originals.

Life and Work

Early life
Chase Coleman was born in Tuscaloosa, Alabama and raised in Monroe, Louisiana. He attended Grace Episcopal School for elementary and junior high education and graduated from St. Frederick Catholic High School. During his second year of high school, he became the lead singer of Crawl Space, a local Monroe rock band until graduation.

After high school, Coleman attended the University of Louisiana at Monroe, pursuing a degree in Business Marketing. While there, he played in a hard rock band called, Fallstaff. However, not long after starting college, Coleman became interested in acting. He began performing with the Straus Community Theater and the Theater of the University of Louisiana at Monroe. During his junior year of college, he signed with the Baton Rouge Agency, Stage 2000, after being recruited by Ron Randell.

Acting career
Coleman was invited to Dallas to compete at the Mike Beaty Model and Talent Expo. It was there that Chase won several awards including best monologue and overall fitness model. He was then discovered by talent manager Suzanne Schachter and was invited to go to New York City to test the market for the summer. While in New York, Coleman was offered the role of Garrett on the popular daytime soap opera, One Life to Live. Not long after landing that role, he received many offers to remain in New York City for professional acting work, shifting to online courses in order to finish his degree. In 2006, he signed with the company Suzelle Enterprises and Abrams Artists Agency through Paul Reisman. During his time in New York, he studied at the HB Studio with Lorraine Serabien, with Susan Batson at Black Nexxus, and with Jennifer Gelfer at the Haymarket Annex Master Class.

One of Coleman's most recognized roles is the portrayal of Billy Winslow in Season 1 of Boardwalk Empire, as well as guest starring on The Good Wife, Gossip Girl, Law & Order: Criminal Intent, and Kings.  He has had many starring and supporting roles in numerous independent films such as New York City Serenade, Catahoula, One Night Stand, Halloween Season, Grill Check, God Don’t Make the Laws, The Halls of Montezuma, Warehouse Rumble, Mama, 8:46, Roses, Cloak and Dagger, The J Packages, Pop Up, and Love Hunter. He also played the lead of Andrew in the off-Broadway play My Big Gay Italian Wedding.

In 2010, Coleman won the Screen Actors Guild Award for "Outstanding Performance by an Ensemble in a Drama Series," for his role on Boardwalk Empire. He was then cast as Dr. Dane Sullivan in the web series, In Between Men. It was this role that got Coleman nominated for an Indie Soap Award for "Best Supporting Actor in a Drama," in 2011.

Coleman founded the production company Bloodstone Productions and created the short film Into the Rose Garden that he wrote, directed, and starred in. Then, in the summer of 2012, he guest starred as Robert in the pilot of the TV series The Americans, as well as worked on filming Season 2 of In Between Men in autumn of the same year.

In 2014, Coleman was cast as the werewolf, Oliver, on the hit TV show The Originals, the popular spin-off show of The Vampire Diaries. His role as Oliver spanned a total of twelve episodes between Season 1 and Season 2 of the series.

After his role of Oliver, Coleman went on to work on more independent films like Recorded Lives, Justice Served, Heaven's Renegade Angel, The Viking and the Pendulum, The Return, and Life's Too Short, to name a few.

Later in 2016, Coleman landed a guest-starring role on the NBC series, Aquarius, as Terry Melcher, a character that spanned three episodes.

Currently, Coleman is appearing globally at several fan conventions developed for The Vampire Diaries and The Originals, both as a guest star and musician.

Music 
During his pursuit of expanding his acting career, music follows close behind. In 2014, while guest-starring in the fan convention circuit, Coleman began playing music acoustically for the audience; he covered mainstream music as well as singing original songs he had written.

Mercy Mode 

In January 2017, Coleman, along with friends Chris Weaver and Micah Parker, formed the band, Mercy Mode. Their first single, "Take It All," was released on March 15, 2017 and is available on iTunes, Spotify, Amazon, and Google Play.

Filmography

Actor

Director

Writer

Stage

Awards and nominations

References

External links
 
 
 
 Mercy Mode Official Website

American male television actors
American male musicians
American rock guitarists
American rock singers
American film directors
Living people
1985 births